The solar eclipse of October 25, 2022, was a partial solar eclipse visible from Europe, the Urals and Western Siberia, Central Asia, Western Asia, South Asia and from the north-east of Africa. The maximal phase of the partial eclipse occurred on the West Siberian Plain in Russia near Nizhnevartovsk, where more than 82% of the Sun was eclipsed by the Moon. In India, the Sun was eclipsed during sunset ranging from 58% in the north and around 2% in the south. From Western Europe it appeared to be around 15-30% eclipsed. It was visible between 08:58 UTC, the greatest point of eclipse occurred at 11:00 UTC and it ended at 13:02 UTC. 

A partial solar eclipse occurs in the polar regions of the Earth when the center of the Moon's shadow misses the Earth.

Gallery

Related eclipses

Eclipses of 2022 
 A partial solar eclipse on April 30.
 A total lunar eclipse on May 16.
 A total lunar eclipse on November 8.

Saros 124

Solar eclipses of 2022–2025

Metonic series

References

External links 

2022 10 25
2022 in science
October 2022 events
2022 10 25

•https://www.forbes.com/sites/jamiecartereurope/2022/10/20/solar-eclipse-2022-everything-you-need-to-know-about-next-weeks-partial-eclipse-of-the-sun/amp/